Sören Halfar (born 2 January 1987) is a German former professional footballer who plays as a left-back.

Club career
Born in Hannover, Halfar joined his hometown club's youth ranks in January 2001, and progressed to the senior squad list for the 2004–05 season. He made his Bundesliga debut on 29 January 2005 in a 1–0 win at Arminia Bielefeld. His time since has twice been blighted by torn cruciate ligament injuries, although he has managed a handful of first team appearances in each season since his debut.

In January 2007, Halfar joined SC Paderborn 07 on loan from his home club, the Bundesliga side Hannover 96.

He left SC Paderborn in summer 2010 when his contract ran out. On 3 June 2010, he signed a two-year contract for Wacker Burghausen, leaving for SV Sandhausen a year later.

International career
Halfar has four caps for the Germany Under-21 side after progressing from the Under-19s.

References

External links
 

1987 births
Living people
Association football fullbacks
German footballers
Germany under-21 international footballers
Bundesliga players
2. Bundesliga players
3. Liga players
Hannover 96 players
SC Paderborn 07 players
SV Wacker Burghausen players
SV Sandhausen players
TSV Havelse managers
Footballers from Hanover
Germany youth international footballers